Hellinsia adumbratus is a moth of the family Pterophoridae that is endemic to South Africa.

References

adumbratus
Endemic moths of South Africa
Moths described in 1881